Darren Benjamin Shepherd is an American screenwriter and film director.   He was born in San Jose, CA and graduated with film and music degrees from San Jose State University.

He most recently wrote the film The First Ride of Wyatt Earp now called Wyatt Earp's Revenge with Val Kilmer starring in the lead role as Wyatt Earp, Jeffrey Schenck producing and Peter Sullivan co-producing. He also wrote and directed Bump City, a short film based on the life of an American singer who was convicted of triple murder, and wrote and co-directed New Hope Landing, a short film in the horror. 
 
Darren is currently a screenwriter for ARO Entertainment, an independent film production company in Beverly Hills, CA.  In addition to Wyatt Earp's Revenge, he also wrote Meteor Impact, Broken Engagement, Discipline and others, all films in various stages of development.

Prior to his writing assignments for ARO Entertainment, he worked on films as an Assistant Director, Casting Associate and Production Assistant for such films as Casino, Con Air, Mars Attacks!, Breakdown, Ed TV, The Grinch, High Crimes, The Cat in the Hat, The X-Files, Deadwood, and Monk.

His background includes a short career as a professional musician in Las Vegas, NV.

References

External links

American male screenwriters
Living people
Writers from San Jose, California
San Jose State University alumni
Film directors from California
Screenwriters from California
Year of birth missing (living people)